Sosei (844 – 910) was a Japanese waka poet and Buddhist priest. He is listed as one of the Thirty-six Poetry Immortals, and one of his poems was included in the famous anthology Hyakunin Isshu. His father Henjō was also a waka poet and monk.

Sosei entered religious life sometime after his father, who took the tonsure after the death of Emperor Ninmyō in 850.

Waka Poems

Sokoi-naki fuchi-yawa-sawagu yamagawa-no asaki-seni-koso adanami-wa-tate (Kokin waka shu)

Translation: The deep pools do not have waves, but the shallow rapids of mountain rivers often have waves.

Interpretation of love: My deep love for you is unmoved. It is frivolous love that causes rumors.

Interpretation of a life lesson: The fine man is quiet, but the petty man is noisy.

External links
 E-text of Sosei's poems

840s births
910 deaths
Year of birth uncertain
Heian period Buddhist clergy
Japanese Buddhist clergy
Japanese male poets
9th-century Japanese poets
Hyakunin Isshu poets